Tan Yankai (January 25, 1880 – September 22, 1930) was a Chinese politician.

Biography

Tan Yankai was born on 25 January 1880 in Hangzhou during the waning decades of the Qing dynasty. He was the son of the Qing minister Tan Zhonglin. A member of Liang Qichao's Constitutionalist Party, he campaigned for a parliament and restrained monarchy.  As the party renamed itself the Progressive Party after the Xinhai Revolution, he was a major leader.

He left and joined the Kuomintang and became military governor of his home province.  He remained neutral during Sun Yatsen's attempt to overthrow President Yuan Shikai in the 1913 Second Revolution, but Yuan removed him anyway. He returned to power after Yuan's death and led his province into resisting the Beiyang Army in 1917's Constitutional Protection War, which saved Sun's Guangdong base. After a brief attempt at spearheading federalism, his subordinates forced him to resign. When Chen Jiongming was driven out of Guangzhou, Tan was made home minister by Sun.

He served as Chairman of the National Government during the first half of the Northern Expedition and again during its conclusion. He was a member of Wang Jingwei's Wuhan faction and was the first internationally recognized head of state of the Nanjing-based Kuomintang government. The United States was the first major power to give recognition on October 1, 1928, though they had already given de facto recognition back in July. After the Organic Law came to effect on the Double Ten Day, he was succeeded by Chiang Kai-shek. Tan then became premier, a post he would hold until he died in office.

Death

He is entombed in the grounds of the Linggu Temple, near the Sun Yat-sen Mausoleum in Nanjing.

Personal life
His daughter, married Chen Cheng.

See also
 Nationalist Government (China)

1880 births
1930 deaths
Politicians from Hangzhou
Republic of China politicians from Zhejiang
Premiers of the Republic of China
Members of the Kuomintang
Progressive Party (China) politicians
Qing dynasty politicians from Zhejiang
Governors of Hunan
Burials in Nanjing